|}

References

Sources

 

Alburquerque
Buildings and structures in Bohol